Luis Perea may refer to:

Luis Carlos Perea (born 1963), Colombian football centre-back
Luis Amaranto Perea (born 1979), Colombian football manager and former defender
Luis Alberto Perea (born 1986), Colombian football striker, and son of Luis Carlos Perea
Luis Perea (footballer, born 1997), Spanish football midfielder